The Erfoud manuport (300,000-200,000 BP) is a 70 mm long and 35 mm wide (at its widest point) fossilized fragment of a cuttlefish resembling naturalistic, life-size, non-erect human phallus.

The fossil was found in 1984 by Lutz Fiedler of Marburg University, Germany, at an archaeological site near the towns of Erfoud and Rissani in eastern Morocco. It was located among a dense cluster of Late Acheulian stone tools. No evidence of carving or shaping have been detected.

While cuttlefish fossils are not themselves rare in other parts of Morocco, they are not native to the region in which the Erfoud manuport was found. It has, therefore, been thought that this fossil was intentionally brought back to the camp due to its natural phallic resemblance, which makes it a candidate for being a manuport. However, no further research regarding this artifact has been done.

See also
Makapansgat pebble

References

External links
Black and white photos by Robert Bednarik
Colored photo by Robert Bednarik

Specific fossil specimens
Quaternary fossil record
Archaeological artifacts
Archaeology of Morocco
Acheulean
1984 archaeological discoveries
Geofacts